Another Perfect World (2001) is the seventh solo album by music artist Peter Cetera and his sixth since leaving the group Chicago. The track, "Perfect World" peaked at number 21 on the Adult Contemporary chart. Perhaps one of the most notable songs on the album is Cetera's remake of the Lennon-McCartney penned "It's Only Love."

Track listing 

 "Perfect World" (Jim Weatherly, Peter Cetera) – 4:59
 "Rain Love" (Chris Pelcer, Robert White Johnson, Al Denson) – 4:03
 "Just Like Love" (Pelcer, Leslie Mills) – 3:38
 "Feels Like Rain" (Karla Bonoff, Cetera) – 4:43
 "I'm Coming Home" (Pelcer, Katinka Hartcamp) – 4:23
 "It's Only Love" (John Lennon, Paul McCartney) – 3:28
 "Rule the World" (Pelcer, Mills) – 5:08
 "Have A Little Faith" (J.D. Martin, Cetera) – 5:45
 "Only Heaven Knows" (Jamie Houston, Martin) – 5:38
 "Whatever Gets You Through" (Pelcer) – 4:44

Personnel 
 Peter Cetera –  lead and backing vocals
 Michael Omartian – keyboards, arrangements, backing vocals (8)
 Bruce Gaitsch – acoustic guitar
 Biff Watson – acoustic guitar
 Kenny Greenberg – electric guitar
 George Marinelli – electric guitar
 Jerry McPherson – electric guitar
 Jimmie Lee Sloas – bass (all except 4)
 Willie Weeks – bass (4)
 John Hammond – drums
 Chris McHugh – drums
 Eric Darken – percussion
 Mark Douthit – saxophones
 Chris McDonald – trombone
 Jeff Bailey – trumpet
 Mike Haynes – trumpet
 Michael Mellett – backing vocals (2, 5)
 Gene Miller – backing vocals (2, 5)
 Chris Rodriguez – backing vocals (2, 5)
 Lisa Bevill – backing vocals (3, 8)
 Tiffany Palmer – backing vocals (3, 8)
 Nicol Sponberg – backing vocals (3, 8)

Production 
 Produced by Michael Omartian and Peter Cetera
 Production Coordinator – Suzy Martinez
 Engineered and Mixed by Terry Christian
 Mix Assistant – Drew Bollman
 Mastered by Hank Williams at MasterMix (Nashville, TN).
 Cover Art, Design, Photography and Tray Card Art by Sprintz-Hall.
 Package Graphics by d'Bodavus Graphics, Inc.

References

2001 albums
Peter Cetera albums
Albums produced by Michael Omartian